Caesium cadmium chloride (CsCdCl3) is a synthetic crystalline material. It belongs to the AMX3 group (where A=alkali metal, M=bivalent metal, X=halogen ions). It crystallizes in a hexagonal space group P63/mmc  with unit cell lengths a = 7.403 Å and c = 18.406 Å, with one cadmium ion having D3d symmetry and the other having C3v symmetry.

It is formed when an aqueous solution of hydrochloric acid containing an equimolar solution of caesium chloride and cadmium chloride.

References

Metal halides
Crystals
Optical materials
Caesium compounds
Cadmium compounds
Chlorides